Charles Harold Bernstein (born February 28, 1943) is an American composer of film and television scores. He is a Daytime Emmy Award winner, and a two-time Primetime Emmy Award nominee. Since 1995, he has been a member of the Board of Governors of the Academy of Motion Picture Arts and Sciences' Music Branch, and is a member of the Board of Directors for both the American Society of Composers, Authors and Publishers and the Society of Composers & Lyricists.

Early life and education
Bernstein was born in Minneapolis to mother Mildred Wolf (1910–2011) and father Charles Bernstein, Sr. (????-1952).  His mother was a pianist.  As for his father, he "was involved in writing and producing music in his early career," according to Bernstein.  Bernstein also has a sister Carol Auslander and a stepfather Julius Wolf.  Bernstein studied music at the Juilliard School.

Career
Bernstein did his first score for the 1969 Oscar-winning documentary, Czechoslovakia 1968.  According to Bernstein, "I met the director, Denis Sanders, through friends at UCLA. It was a brilliant film, and I convinced Denis that I knew what sort of music would tell the story of the Russian invasion of its smaller neighbor. The film was unusual because it had no spoken words, only music and occasional sound effects to tell the story."

His first Hollywood score was for the United Artists film, White Lightning (1973), starring Burt Reynolds.  The film marked the first of many collaborations between Bernstein and director Joseph Sargent.  Bernstein also scored the sequel to the film, Gator (1976).  Other films Bernstein scored during the 1970s include Hex (1973), That Man Bolt (1973), Mr. Majestyk (1974), Trackdown (1976), A Small Town in Texas (1976), Viva Knievel! (1977), Outlaw Blues (1977) and Love at First Bite (1979).  He even wrote the dance music in the latter film.

During the 1980s, Bernstein scored the music for the horror films The Entity (1982), Cujo (1983), April Fool's Day (1986) and Deadly Friend (1986).  Bernstein also scored non-horror films such as Foolin' Around (1980).

He continued to score music for documentaries such as Maya Lin: A Strong Clear Vision (1994) and After Innocence (2005), with the former winning the Academy Award for Best Documentary.  He also scored music for made-for-television movies such as Sadat (1983), Miss Evers' Boys (1997), The Long Island Incident (1998) and Out of the Ashes (2003).

Bernstein reunited with Cujo director Lewis Teague to score his films, Cante Jondo (2007) and Charlotta-TS (2010).

A Nightmare on Elm Street
Under the recommendation of his agent, Bernstein met with Wes Craven and was hired to score his film, A Nightmare on Elm Street (1984).  On working with Craven: "Wes was easy to work with, he gave me a lot of freedom, but we could discuss ideas and approaches. In many ways he was an ideal director to communicate with because he listened well and was open to all ideas."  Bernstein used an electric score since the film was low budget.

Bernstein did not return to score the music for the other films in the franchise, though Renny Harlin briefly talked to him about scoring the fourth film.

Use of his music
Quentin Tarantino has included Bernstein's music from White Lightning and The Entity in the soundtracks of his films Kill Bill: Volume 1 (2003) and Inglourious Basterds (2009).

Personal life
Bernstein is married to Georgianne Cowan.  They have one daughter, Serina.  They reside in Los Angeles.

In addition to film composing, Bernstein is also the author of two books.  One of them is titled Film Music and Everything Else.  The other is Movie Music: An Insider’s View.  He has also taught courses in the University of Southern California and the University of California, Los Angeles.

Bernstein has been a long-serving member of the Board of Governors of the Academy of Motion Picture Arts and Sciences since 1995.  He is also in the Board of Directors for both the American Society of Composers, Authors and Publishers and the Society of Composers & Lyricists.  He co-founded the latter organization.

Filmography

Film

Television

TV movies

References

External links
 
 
 Charles Bernstein on his work with Lewis Teague on YouTube

1943 births
20th-century American composers
21st-century American composers
Musicians from Minneapolis
American film score composers
American television composers
Juilliard School alumni
Living people
American male film score composers
USC Thornton School of Music faculty
UCLA School of the Arts and Architecture alumni
20th-century American male musicians
21st-century American male musicians
Varèse Sarabande Records artists